The Varangerfjord is the easternmost fjord in Norway, north of Finland. The fjord is located in Troms og Finnmark county between the Varanger Peninsula and the mainland of Norway. The fjord flows through the municipalities of Vardø, Vadsø, Nesseby, and Sør-Varanger. In a strict sense, it is a false fjord, since it does not have the hallmarks of a fjord carved by glaciers.

The fjord stretches westwards inland past the town of Vadsø to the village of Varangerbotn in Nesseby Municipality.

History
The Kven residents of Varangerfjord are largely descendants of Finnish immigrants who arrived to the area during the 19th century from Finland and northern Sweden.

During the first half of the 19th century, the possibility of Russia demanding the cession of a stretch of coast along the Varangerfjord was for some time on the European diplomatic agenda, inducing King Oscar I of Sweden and Norway to conclude an alliance (1855) with Britain and France in order to forestall this possibility.

Important Bird Area
A 55,450 ha area comprising the northern coast of the fjord and the nearby islands of Hornøya and Reinøya, including intertidal and neritic habitats as well as coastal wetlands and tundra grassland, has been designated an Important Bird Area (IBA) by BirdLife International because it supports large numbers of waterbirds, seabirds and waders, either breeding or overwintering. These include lesser white-fronted geese, long-tailed ducks, king eiders, common eiders, Steller's eiders, velvet scoters, red-breasted mergansers, yellow-billed loons, purple sandpipers, black-legged kittiwakes, glaucous gulls, Arctic herring gulls, Atlantic puffins and common murres.

References

External links

Fjords of Troms og Finnmark
Bays of the Barents Sea
Norway–Russia border
International fjords
Important Bird Areas of Norway
Important Bird Areas of the Arctic
Seabird colonies
Vardø
Vadsø
Nesseby
Sør-Varanger